Vyazma is the name of several inhabited localities in Russia.

Modern localities
Urban localities
Vyazma, a town in Vyazemsky District of Smolensk Oblast

Rural localities
Vyazma, Kaluga Oblast, a village in Sukhinichsky District of Kaluga Oblast
Vyazma, Lipetsk Oblast, a village in Lebyazhensky Selsoviet of Izmalkovsky District in Lipetsk Oblast; 
Vyazma, Tver Oblast, a village in Verkhnevolzhskoye Rural Settlement of Kalininsky District in Tver Oblast

Alternative names
Vyazma, alternative name of Vyazemskoye, a village in Klementyevskoye Rural Settlement of Mozhaysky District in Moscow Oblast;

See also
Vyazemsky (disambiguation)